Echinops spinosissimus is a European species of plant in the tribe Cardueae within the family Asteraceae. It is native to southeastern Europe (Sicily, Apulia, Greece, Albania, and the western Balkans), northern Africa, and southwest Asia as far east as Iran.

Echinops spinosissimus is a branching perennial herb up to 80 cm (2 feet) tall. Leaves are divided into narrow triangular lobes, each with a slender but hard spine at the tip. The plant produces nearly spherical flower heads containing many white or pale lavender disc florets but no ray florets.<ref>[http://botany.cz/cs/echinops-spinosissimus/ Czech Botany, 'Echinops spinosissimus Turra – bělotrn / ježibaba] in Czech with photos</ref>

Subspecies
 Echinops spinosissimus subsp. bithynicus (Boiss.) Greuter 
 Echinops spinosissimus subsp. bovei (Boiss.) Greuter 
 Echinops spinosissimus subsp. fontqueri (Pau) Greuter 
 Echinops spinosissimus subsp. macrolepis (Boiss.) Greuter 
 Echinops spinosissimus subsp. neumayeri (Vis.) Kožuharov 
 Echinops spinosissimus subsp. spinosissimus''

References

External links
Wildscreen Arkive, Echinops (Echinops spinosissimus)
Flora silvestre del Mediterráneo, Echinops spinosissimus Turra photos

spinosissimus
Flora of Europe
Flora of North Africa
Plants described in 1765